Dysomma bucephalus is an eel in the family Synaphobranchidae (cutthroat eels). It was described by Alfred William Alcock in 1889. It is a tropical, marine eel which is known from the Indo-Pacific. It is known to dwell at a maximum depth of 353 metres.

References

Synaphobranchidae
Fish described in 1889